Liverus Hull (September 14, 1822 – May 2, 1894) was a Massachusetts businessman and politician who served as a member of the Boards of Aldermen of Charlestown and Boston, and as the ninth mayor of Charlestown, Massachusetts.

Notes

1822 births
1894 deaths
Mayors of Charlestown, Massachusetts
Massachusetts city council members
19th-century American politicians